The Tiasmyn is a right tributary of the Dnieper River in Ukraine. The Tiasmyn originates in the north central part of the Dnieper hills in the central Ukrainian province of Kirovohrad. From there it flows through the Cherkasy Oblast, where it finally flows into the Kremenchuk Reservoir. The river forms a U-turn (180°) in its central run. Not counting the river's sharp turn, the river's source and its delta are located only 33 km (21 mi) away from each other.

Along the river's lower section there are important discovery sites of the Bilogrudivka/Chernoles culture near the settlement of Subotiv. These findings represent key late Bronze Age discoveries.

Cities and towns located on the river include: Kamianka, Smila, and Chyhyryn.

References

Rivers of Cherkasy Oblast
Rivers of Kirovohrad Oblast